Gregg-Wallace Farm Tenant House is a historic home located near Mars Bluff, Florence County, South Carolina.  It was built about 1890, and is representative of a typical Mars Bluff vernacular tenant house for African Americans. Tenant houses often evolved from one-room slave houses, first by the addition of a shed room at the rear and a front porch, then by the addition of a second room.

It was listed on the National Register of Historic Places in 2002.

References

African-American history of South Carolina
Houses on the National Register of Historic Places in South Carolina
Houses completed in 1890
Houses in Florence County, South Carolina
National Register of Historic Places in Florence County, South Carolina